Maulana Mazharul Haque (22 December 1866 – 2 January 1930) was an educator, lawyer, independence activist and freedom fighter of the Indian National Movement.

Early life and education 
Maulana Mazharul Haque was born on 22 December 1866 in Bahpura, Patna, Bihar.

He attended Patna College and Canning College, Lucknow, and moved to England in 1888 to pursue legal studies. There he was introduced to Mahatma Gandhi.

He constructed a house in Faridpur, Siwan, Bihar and named it Ashiyana. It was visited by many nationalists, including Rajendra Prasad and Mahatma Gandhi.

Life after 1891 

In 1891, he returned to India as a barrister and joined the judicial services. In 1896, he started practising as a lawyer. In 1906, he left Chhapra and started practising in Patna and in the same year he was elected Vice-President of Bihar Congress Committee.

Between 1910-11 he was elected as a member of the Imperial Legislative Council of India (British Parliament). In 1911, a third "Bihar State Conference" was held under the chairmanship of Maulana at the conference to demand a separate Bihar state.

He was active in the Treaty of Indian National Congress and Muslim League in 1916. He joined the Home Rule Movement started by Annie Besant in 1916 and actively participated in the Champaran Satyagraha in 1917. Mahatma Gandhi's guest hospitality came to Patna for Champaran Satyagraha at his home "Sikandar Manzil".

During 1919, he was active in the Khilafat Movement and in 1920 he joined the Non-Cooperation Movement on Gandhiji's call. In 1921, Gandhiji was impressed and established "Sadaqat Ashram" (abode of truth) in Patna. From the same ashram, Haque started a weekly magazine called "Motherland". He was a strong advocate of Hindu-Muslim unity. His statement was "Whether we are Hindus or Muslims, we are on the same boat. If we overcome, we will sink, we will sink together".

He announced his retirement from active politics in the 1926, but leaders like Mahatma Gandhi, Maulana Azad and Nehru never left him. He died on 2 January 1930. A residential colony in siwan is named after him (Maulana Mazharul haq colony or better known MM Colony).

A stamp was issued in his honour by the Indian Postal Service in 1981 and in 1998, Maulana Mazharul Haq Arabic Persian University was established in Patna in his memory.

Cited Sources

References

External links 

1886 births
1930 deaths
First Nehru ministry
Bihari politicians
Indian independence activists from Bihar
20th-century Indian Muslims
Indian nationalists
Prisoners and detainees of British India
Founders of Indian schools and colleges
Indian male journalists
Journalists from Bihar
People from Bihar
20th-century Indian journalists
Indian independence activists from Bengal
People from Patna district